Darreh Duzdan or Darreh Dozdan or Darreh Dazdan or Darrehdozdan may refer to:

Darreh Dozdan, Khuzestan
Darreh Dazdan, Kohgiluyeh and Boyer-Ahmad
Darreh Duzdan, Lorestan